Sebastian Schmitt (born February 29, 1996) is a German professional basketball player who plays for Academics Heidelberg of the ProA. In the past, he played for Eisbären Bremerhaven of the Basketball Bundesliga (BBL).

Professional career
After playing with the youth teams of Bayern Munich, Schmitt began his professional career with the reserve team of Bayern Munich in the German 4th Division. In the 2015-16 season he debuted in the German 1st Division for Bayern.

On September 8, 2016, Schmitt signed a one-year contract with Eisbären Bremerhaven.

References 

1996 births
Living people
Eisbären Bremerhaven players
FC Bayern Munich basketball players
German men's basketball players
People from Rosenheim
Sportspeople from Upper Bavaria
Point guards
USC Heidelberg players